Won Yun-jong (born 17 June 1985) is a South Korean bobsledder.

Won competed at the 2014 Winter Olympics for South Korea. He teamed with brakeman Seo Young-woo in the South Korea-1 sled in the two-man event, finishing 18th, and with Seo, Jun Jung-lin and Suk Young-ji in the four-man, finishing 20th.

As of 2017, his best showing at the World Championships is 5th, in the two-man event in 2015.

Won made his World Cup debut in December 2010. As of 2017, his best World Cup finish is 1st, in 2015-16 at Whistler and Konigssee, Germany. He was the overall champion of the 2015-16 season for the two-man category.

Along with teammate Seo, Won placed sixth out of 30 teams in the two-man event at the 2018 Winter Olympics in Pyeongchang on February 19, recording an overall time of 3:17.40 in four runs. Although they failed to win a medal, it was the best Olympic result by an Asian bobsleigh team. The following week, on February 25, the South Korean four-man team of pilot Won, Seo, Kim Dong-hyun and Jun Jung-lin won a surprising silver medal in the four-man event, tying with a German team led by Nico Walther. With the silver medal, South Korea became the first Asian nation to claim an Olympic medal in a bobsleigh event.

References

External links

1985 births
Living people
Olympic bobsledders of South Korea
Sportspeople from Seoul
Bobsledders at the 2014 Winter Olympics
Bobsledders at the 2018 Winter Olympics
Bobsledders at the 2022 Winter Olympics
South Korean male bobsledders
Olympic medalists in bobsleigh
Olympic silver medalists for South Korea
Medalists at the 2018 Winter Olympics